Robert Thompson (21 November 1884 – 1974) was a Scottish road racing cyclist who competed in the 1912 Summer Olympics. Thompson was born in Coldstream in the Scottish Borders.

In 1912 he was a member of the Scotland cycling team which finished fourth in the team time trial. In the individual time trial he finished 24th.

References

1884 births
1974 deaths
Scottish male cyclists
Olympic cyclists of Great Britain
Cyclists at the 1912 Summer Olympics
Scottish Olympic competitors
People from Coldstream
Sportspeople from the Scottish Borders